Western Vinyl is an independent record label founded in 1998 and based in Austin, Texas. The imprint was formed by Brian Sampson and Ryan Murphy originally to release their lo-fi indie rock projects as Win Foster and Havergal.

Artists

Abram Shook
Air Waves
Aisha Burns
Alexander Turnquist
Anomoanon
Appendix Out
Ava Luna
Balmorhea
Bexar Bexar
Bonnie Prince Billy
Botany
Callers
Caroline Says
Carter Tanton
Chas. Mtn.
Christopher Tignor
Dawn Landes
Diane Coffee
Dirty Projectors
Early Day Miners
Elephant Micah
Et Ret
Gary Wilson
Glass Ghost
Goldmund
Grooms
Heather Woods Broderick
Here We Go Magic
In Tall Buildings
JBM
J. Tillman
Joseph Shabason
Julie Sokolow
Kaitlyn Aurelia Smith
Köhn
Lightning Dust
Luke Temple
Logan Farmer
Lushlife
Luxury Liners
Lymbyc Systym
Madagascar
Mint Julep
Moon Bros.
Nat Baldwin
Nightlands
Ola Podrida
Oren Ambarchi
Papa M
Peter Broderick
Peter Oren
Pierre Bastien
Rob Burger
Robert Lippok
Rolf Julius
The Rosebuds
Salim Nourallah
Secret Cities
Shuta Hasunuma
Sleep Whale
Slow Six
Soema Montenegro
Stone Jack Jones
Tetuzi Akiyama
Tren Brothers
Úlfur
Voices & Organs
Wires Under Tension
Young Moon

See also
 List of companies based in Austin, Texas
 List of record labels

References

External links
 Official site

Rock record labels
Record labels established in 1998
American independent record labels
Indie rock record labels
Experimental music record labels
Electronic music record labels
Companies based in Austin, Texas